Précy is the name or part of the name of several communes in France:
Précy, in the Cher department
Précy-le-Sec, in the  Yonne department
Précy-Notre-Dame, in the  Aube department
Précy-Saint-Martin, in the  Aube department
Précy-sous-Thil, in the  Côte-d'Or department
Précy-sur-Marne, in the  Seine-et-Marne department
Précy-sur-Oise, in the  Oise department
Précy-sur-Vrin, in the  Yonne department